Petter Sørlle (February 16, 1884 – May 29, 1933) was a Norwegian whaling captain and inventor.

Biography
Petter Martin Mattias Koch Sørlle was born at Tune (now Sarpsborg) in  Østfold, Norway. Both his father and grandfather had been sailors. He was engaged in whaling from Vestfold  and later participated in Antarctica  whaling  near the South Georgia Island and South Orkney Islands.

He invented slipways for whaling ships which he patented in 1922. His invention was a device by which the whale could be fully drawn to the ship. The pickup slip was first used in the Antarctic Ocean by the whaling company  Globus of Larvik  on board the FLK Lancing during the season 1925–26.

Sørlle was the first manager of the United Whalers whaling shore station at Stromness, South Georgia. He carried out surveys  and is commemorated by several place names in Antarctic waters.

Sørlle Buttress, the Sørlle Rocks and Cape Sørlle are all Antarctic features named after him.

List of features named by Sørlle 
During his running surveys, Sørlle named a number of features in the South Orkney Islands, including:
 Gerd Island
 Signy Island
 Reid Island

See also
 Falkland Harbour

References

Other sources
Næss, Øyvind (1951)  Hvalfangerselskapet Globus A/S 1925–1950 : et kapitel av den moderne hvalfangsts historie (Larvik: Hvalfangerselskapet Globus)

External links
Kaptein Petter Sørlle

1884 births
1922 deaths
People from Østfold
Norwegian people in whaling
20th-century Norwegian inventors
Norwegian polar explorers
History of South Georgia
History of Antarctica